SS Matunga was a 1,618-gross register ton passenger-cargo ship, built by Napier and Miller, Glasgow for Mersey Steamship Co., Liverpool and originally named Zweena. Purchased by Burns Philp & Co. Ltd in 1910 for the British Solomon Islands service. Burns Philp was operating seven plantations in the Solomon Islands through subsidiaries - the Solomon Islands Development Company, the Shortland Islands Plantation Ltd and Choiseul Plantations Ltd.

While en route from Sydney to Rabaul, on 6 August 1917 she was captured by the German raiding ship . The coal was transferred to the Wolf, then time bombs were placed on the Matunga and she sank stern first near Waigeo Island.

References

Merchant ships of Australia
Ships built on the River Clyde
1900 ships
World War I shipwrecks in the Pacific Ocean
Maritime incidents in 1917